The black-billed koel (Eudynamys melanorhynchus) is a species of cuckoo in the family Cuculidae. It is endemic to forest and woodland on the Indonesian islands of Sulawesi, Sula, Banggai, Togian and other smaller nearby islands. It has often been considered conspecific with E. scolopaceus, but they are increasingly treated as separate species. Unlike the black-billed koel, all other members of the common koel complex have a pale bill. The black billed koel voice a typical "koel!" call, or a short series of rising and falling "woo" notes.

References

black-billed koel
Endemic birds of Sulawesi
black-billed koel
Taxonomy articles created by Polbot
Taxobox binomials not recognized by IUCN